Route 40 is a  east–west state route located in northeastern Massachusetts, entirely within Middlesex County. The short highway connects Groton and Chelmsford.  Its western end is at an intersection with Massachusetts Route 119 and Massachusetts Route 225 in Groton, and its eastern end is at Route 3A in North Chelmsford.  The route has existed since the late 1940s.

U.S. Route 3 has an interchange with Route 40, at exit 33.



Route description
Route 40 begins in the west near the center of Groton at an intersection with Main Street (Routes 119 and 225).  The highway proceeds eastward out of the downtown area, passing through the northern part of the town of Westford.  Most of the route winds through rather densely wooded areas, with several ponds located alongside or near the highway.  The road continues into the Chelmsford neighborhood of North Chelmsford, where it interchanges with U.S. Route 3 at Exit 33.  Route 40 continues another mile eastward, emerging from the woods before ending at an intersection with Route 3A in the center of North Chelmsford at Vinal Square, located just west of the Merrimack River.

Major intersections

References

 (Wayback Machine archive, original site down)

040
Transportation in Middlesex County, Massachusetts